Tim Menzel (born 1 January 1992) is a German international rugby union player, playing for the TSV Handschuhsheim in the Rugby-Bundesliga and the German national rugby union team.

He made his debut for Germany in an ENC match against Poland on 20 November 2010.

Menzel began his rugby career in 1998 and has since played for TSV Handschuhsheim and French club US Colomiers. He has also fielded in the German national under-18 rugby union team in the European Under-18 Rugby Union Championship in 2009 and 2010.

After three years in France, Mentzel returned to his former club in Germany for the 2011-12 season.

Stats
Tim Menzel's personal statistics in club and international rugby:

Club

 As of 30 April 2012

National team

European Nations Cup

Friendlies & other competitions

 As of 28 April 2013

References

External links
 Tim Menzel at totalrugby.de 
 
 Tim Menzel at the DRV website 

1992 births
Living people
German rugby union players
Germany international rugby union players
TSV Handschuhsheim players
Rugby union scrum-halves